Čulina is a Croatian surname.

People with the surname include:
Antonini Čulina (born 1992), Croatian football player
Arijana Čulina (born 1965), Croatian actress
Branko Čulina (born 1957), a Croatian-born Australian football coach, and former player
Jason Culina (born 1980), an Australian-born football player
Vlado Čulina (born 1965), Croatian military officer

See also
Culina (disambiguation), Latin for "kitchen"

Croatian surnames